FC Sfîntul Gheorghe is a Moldovan professional football club based in Suruceni, Moldova. They play in the Moldovan Super Liga, the top division in Moldovan football.

History
The club was formed in 2003. Until 2007, it was represented by seven youth teams, aged 10–18 years. In 2007, the Under-18 team became the champion of The Republic of Moldova. In 2008–2009, the club decided to enter the second tier of Moldovan football, the Divizia A.

In 2009, due to an excellent infrastructure of two stadiums, one with artificial turf and another with natural turf, the club met all the licensing criteria and obtained the "A" licence, which allowed the team to play in the Divizia Națională.

Honours

League
Divizia Națională
Runners-up: 2019

Divizia A
Runners-up: 2016–17

Cup
Moldovan Cup
 Winners: 2020–21
Runners-up: 2018–19, 2019–20, 2021–22

Moldovan Super Cup
 Winners: 2021

League results

Current squad

European record

Legend: GF = Goals For. GA = Goals Against. GD = Goal Difference.

Notes
 QR: Qualifying round

References

External links
 FC Sfîntul Gheorghe at Soccerway

 
Football clubs in Moldova
Association football clubs established in 2003
2003 establishments in Moldova